Patrick Ebert (born 17 March 1987) is a German professional footballer who plays as a right winger.

Club career

Hertha
Born in Potsdam, East Germany, Ebert started playing football for TuS Gaarden in Kiel at the age of four. He completed his development with Hertha BSC, joining the Berlin-based club in 1998.

Ebert made his official debut with the first team on 16 July 2006, coming on as an 81st-minute substitute in a 0–0 home draw against FC Moscow in that year's UEFA Intertoto Cup. He first appeared in the Bundesliga on 13 August, again coming from the bench in the 0–0 draw at VfL Wolfsburg, and scored his first goal in the competition the following matchday when he opened a 4–0 home rout of Hannover 96.

Ebert contributed 16 games and one goal in the 2009–10 season, as the Blue-Whites were ultimately relegated to the 2. Bundesliga. On 6 June 2012, he was released along with Christian Lell, Andre Mijatović and Andreas Ottl.

Valladolid
Ebert signed with Spain's Real Valladolid on 27 July 2012. He made his first La Liga appearance on 20 August, playing 86 minutes in a 1–0 away win over Real Zaragoza.

Ebert netted six times in his first year with the Castile and León side– including twice in the 3–1 home victory against Mallorca– being first choice in a final escape from relegation.

Spartak Moscow
On 7 February 2014, Ebert was released from his contract with Valladolid, after having already announced the decision to wanting to leave the club and having subjected to disciplinary procedures after refusing to play against Villarreal. Later that day, he signed with Spartak Moscow of the Russian Premier League.

Rayo Vallecano
Ebert returned to Spain on 25 July 2015, joining Rayo Vallecano on a two-year contract. He missed the vast majority of his debut season due to an achilles tendon rupture.

Later years
The following two and a half seasons, Ebert competed in the German second division with FC Ingolstadt 04 and Dynamo Dresden. In October 2020, the 33-year-old free agent signed a one-year deal with Xanthi of the Super League Greece 2. 

Ebert joined İstanbulspor on 26 July 2022, from Kavala also in the Greek second tier.

Career statistics

Honours
Germany
UEFA European Under-21 Championship: 2009

References

External links

1987 births
Living people
Sportspeople from Potsdam
German footballers
Footballers from Brandenburg
Association football wingers
Bundesliga players
2. Bundesliga players
Regionalliga players
Hertha BSC II players
Hertha BSC players
FC Ingolstadt 04 players
FC Ingolstadt 04 II players
Dynamo Dresden players
La Liga players
Segunda División players
Real Valladolid players
Rayo Vallecano players
Russian Premier League players
FC Spartak Moscow players
Super League Greece 2 players
Xanthi F.C. players
Kavala F.C. players
Süper Lig players
İstanbulspor footballers
Germany under-21 international footballers
German expatriate footballers
Expatriate footballers in Spain
Expatriate footballers in Russia
Expatriate footballers in Greece
Expatriate footballers in Turkey
German expatriate sportspeople in Spain
German expatriate sportspeople in Russia
German expatriate sportspeople in Greece
German expatriate sportspeople in Turkey